Skive Municipality is a municipality (Danish, kommune) in Mid Jutland Region on Salling Peninsula, a part of the larger Jutland Peninsula in northwest Denmark. It covers an area of 688.09 km2 (2013) and has a population of 45,078 (2022). Its mayor is Peder Christian Kirkegaard, a member of the Venstre political party.

The main town and the site of its municipal council is the city of Skive.

The Virksund Bridge (Virksundbroen) connects the municipality at the town of Virksund to the town of Sundstrup in Viborg municipality.

As of January 1, 2007, the original Skive municipality ceased to exist as a result of Kommunalreformen ("The Municipal Reform" of 2007). It was merged with the former Sallingsund, Spøttrup, and Sundsøre municipalities, to form the new Skive municipality. The old municipality had an area of 230 km2 and a population of 27,919 (2005). Before the reform, the municipality was part of Viborg County.

Skive itself is a coastal tourist resort, at the mouth of the Karup River (Karup Å) and the Skive Fjord. As of 1992, the population was 19,711. In June 2022, Barack Obama visited the municipality.

Politics

Municipal council
Skive's municipal council consists of 27 members, elected every four years.

Below are the municipal councils elected since the Municipal Reform of 2007.

Attractions
 The 14th century Spøttrup Castle underwent extensive repairs in the 1940s and opened as a museum and medicinal herb garden.
 Skive Art Museum (Skive Kunstmuseum) is housed in a building designed by Danish architect Leopold Teschl, who also designed the Skive Historical Museum. The art museum houses a broad collection of modern Danish art with special interest in expressive landscapes and New Realism painting. Also, the collection includes works by local artists, including Christen Dalsgaard, national romantic painter associated with the Golden Age of Danish Painting.
 The Fur Museum is on the island of Fur, part of the Skive municipality. It features exhibits relating to the island of Fur, particularly fossils.
 The Mønsted Limestone Caves south-west of the town of Skive are run by Denmark's nature-preservation group, Skov- og Naturstyrelse. As well as being a tourist attraction, the caves are used as a place to age cheese, which is then exported to Germany as "cavecheese". In winter, the caves are home to 10,000 bats.

References 

 Municipal statistics: NetBorger Kommunefakta, delivered from KMD aka Kommunedata (Municipal Data)
 Municipal mergers and neighbors: Eniro new municipalities map

External links
 
 Municipality's official website
 The new Skive municipality's official website (Danish only)
 Skive Skive Folkeblad - City Local Newspaper
 Skive tourism bureau
 Spøttrup Castle
 Skive Art Museum
 Mønsted Limestone Caves

 

 
Municipalities of the Central Denmark Region
Municipalities of Denmark
Populated places established in 2007